is a regional political party based in Nagoya, Japan and led by the mayor of Nagoya, Takashi Kawamura. The party was formed by Kawamura in April 2010. After briefly holding several seats in the national legislature, the party merged at the national level with the Tomorrow Party of Japan in November 2012. Genzei Nippon remained a separate party at the  regional level and has been active within Aichi Prefecture. As well as Kawamura, the party has twelve members serving on the Nagoya city council.

History
The party was founded by Takashi Kawamura, then the mayor of Nagoya, and registered with the Aichi Prefectural electoral commission on 26 April 2010. At a press conference held on the same day, Kawamura emphasized the point that the greatest support that politicians can provide to citizens is a reduction in taxes.

The party first gained representation in the national Diet in May 2011 when Yuko Sato, the representative for the Aichi 1st district in the House of Representatives, officially resigned from the ruling Democratic Party of Japan (DPJ). Sato had lodged her resignation papers with the party in March in order to provide support to Genzei Nippon's candidates in the Nagoya city council election, but her application was put on hold while DPJ officials considered expelling instead.

Two more DPJ members of the House of Representatives, Koki Kobayashi from the Tokyo proportional representation block and Toshiaki Koizumi of the Ibaraki 3rd district, left the DPJ to join Genzei Nippon in August 2012. On 31 August the three representatives joined with fellow DPJ defector Tomoyuki Taira to form the "Genzei Nippon-Heian" voting block within the House of Representatives, with Koizumi as the leader.

DPJ representatives Atsushi Kumada (Osaka 1st district) and Tomohiko Mizuno (Southern Kanto proportional representation block) joined Genzei Nippon in October 2012, giving the party five Diet members, the minimum requirement for registration as an official political party. The party was registered with Kawamura as the leader on 31 October 2012. On 13 November Taira, who had remained an independent within the House, left the voting block to join Your Party, which led to the voting block being renamed Genzei Nippon.

On 22 November the party merged at the national level with the "Anti-TPP, Zero Nuclear Party", which had been established just three days prior, to form the "Tax Reduction, Anti-TPP, Zero Nuclear Party". A few days later this group further merged into the Tomorrow Party of Japan in order to contest the December general election.

Genzei Nippon continued to exist at the regional level following the national mergers, led by Kawamura. At the April 2015 unified local elections, the party won 12 seats on the 75-seat Nagoya city council.

Presidents

See also

Tax Cuts Japan

References

External links
 

2010 establishments in Japan
Political parties established in 2010
Political parties in Japan
Regional parties in Japan
Right-wing populist parties
Right-wing populism in Japan